Aaron Pico (born September 23, 1996) is an American mixed martial artist and former freestyle wrestler who currently competes in the featherweight division of Bellator MMA. As a freestyle wrestler, Pico competed at 65 kilograms, where he placed second at 2016 US Olympic Team Trials and holds multiple national and international championships. In the age–group, he was a two–time Junior World Championship medalist and a Cadet World Champion.  As of February 28, 2023, he is #3 in the Bellator Featherweight Rankings.

Background
Pico is a seventh-generation Californio and a member of the Pico family of California, as great-great-great-great-grandson of Pío Pico, 10th Governor of Alta California. He started boxing at the age of ten and also competed in Pankration tournaments.

Wrestling career

Early career 
Pico started wrestling at the age of four, while also competing in multiple other combat sports. During his freshman year of high school, Pico capped off a perfect 42–0 season at St. John Bosco High School and won the CIF state championship at 132 pounds. Afterwards, Pico would compete in freestyle, and after making the US Cadet World Team, he claimed the Cadet World Championship at 63 kilograms. He would also make his senior freestyle debut at age 18, defeating Alibeggadzhi Emeev in a lopsided decision in a dual meet against Russia. In a surprising turn of events, Pico, the top–ranked high school wrestler in the country, signed major endorsement contracts with Dethrone Royalty, an MMA lifestyle apparel company, and a multi–year shoe endorsement with Nike, turning into a professional athlete in 2014. This led him unable to compete in collegiate wrestling as per the rules of the NCAA, but Pico announced he intended to focus solely in freestyle to continue a mixed martial arts career after a 2016 Summer Olympic run, foregoing further education. Before his MMA debut, Pico explained:

Freestyle

2014 
In 2014, Pico claimed the US Junior National Championship in April when he flawlessly defeated outstanding NCAA All–American from Penn State Zain Retherford in the finals, and went on to defeat him two more times in June for the US Junior World Team spot. In July, Pico competed in the senior level, claiming a silver medal from the prestigious Grand Prix of Spain, falling to Yasar Dogu International champion Frank Chamizo. In August, he competed at the Junior World Championships, where he defeated the eventual accomplished Daichi Takatani first round, and went on to defeat four more points by technical fall before facing eventual 2016 Olympic Gold medalist from Iran Hassan Yazdani, whom he lost to on points. In October, he placed third at the prestigious Soslan Andiev International in Russia. In November, he claimed his first senior level gold medal, winning the Henri Deglane Grand Prix, earning the biggest win of his career over 2013 World Champion from Armenia David Safaryan in the finals.

2015 
To start off the year, he competed at the Golden Grand Prix Ivan Yarygin in January, placing 21st after losing first round to Akhmed Chakaev. In February, he claimed the Cerro Pelado International championship, defeating Pan American champions, Franklin Marén and Alejandro Valdés, and two–time US World Team Member Reece Humphrey. In April 6, Pico fell to Dan Hodge Trophy winner Brent Metcalf in a dual meet against Iowa. He then went back to the junior level to claim the US National Championship in May and the US World Team spot in June, defeating Zain Retherford three times in the process. In August, Pico placed third at the Junior World Championships, bringing a bronze medal to the United States.  Back to the senior level, Pico placed fifth at the Intercontinental Cup, third at the Bill Farrell International and fourth at the US Nationals (qualifying for the 2016 US Olympic Team Trials) before the year ended.

2016 
To open up the Olympic year, he moved up to 70 kilograms for two tournaments, placing fifth at the Ukrainian International Open and third at the Alexander Medved Prizes, compiling notable victories over Nazar Kulchytskyy, 2010 Asian Games Gold medalist from Mongolia Ganzorigiin Mandakhnaran and 2015 U23 European Continental medalist from Belarus Andrei Karpach. At the US Olympic Team Trials, Pico defeated 2010 NCAA champion Jason Ness, two–time NCAA champion and US National runner–up Jordan Oliver and three–time US National champion Reece Humphrey to make the best–of–three. In the finals, he faced reigning Pan American champion and 2012 NCAA champion Frank Molinaro, whom he was 2–1 against. After defeating Molinaro first round, Pico was downed twice in razor close matches, losing his opportunity of becoming an Olympian at age 19. This was Pico's last wrestling match before transitioning into MMA. Molinaro went on to place fifth at the Olympics.

Boxing and pankration
In addition to wrestling, Pico also competed in boxing and Pankration. Pico won the national PAL championship in 2008 and was national Junior Golden Gloves champion in 2009, he won 'most outstanding boxer' at both tournaments. In Pankration, Pico also was a national champion in 2008. In addition, Pico went to Ukraine in 2010, and won the golden cup European Pankration championship. During this time Pico also won the California state championships in both sports.

Mixed martial arts career
Pico signed an endorsement contract with Dethrone Royalty, an MMA lifestyle apparel company owned by Nick Swinmurn, founder of Zappos and ownership partner of the Golden State Warriors.

In April 2014, Aaron signed a multi-year shoe endorsement with Nike.

Bellator MMA 
In early November 2014, Aaron signed a long term unprecedented contract with MMA promoter Bellator MMA and its parent company Viacom, as their new blue chip prospect. Bellator MMA President, Scott Coker stated, "Simply put, Aaron has all the makings of MMA's next great superstar, and to have him here at Bellator MMA is something special. Like many of us in the MMA community, Aaron is someone we've been watching closely over the last few years, and after sitting down with Bob Cook and his team, getting a chance to meet Aaron, and hearing his long-term aspirations, the fit became very obvious."

Pico made his professional MMA debut at Bellator NYC on June 24, 2017, at the Madison Square Garden. He lost to Zach Freeman via submission just 24 seconds into the first round in an upset.

After his upset loss to Freeman, Pico moved down to the featherweight division and faced Justin Linn at Bellator 183 on September 23, 2017. He won the fight via knockout in the first round.

Pico faced Shane Krutchen at Bellator 192 on January 20, 2018. He won the fight via TKO in the first round. with a brutal left to Krutchen's body.

Pico faced Lee Morrison at Bellator 199 on May 12, 2018. He won the fight via TKO in the first round.

Pico faced Leandro Higo at Bellator 206 on September 29, 2018. He won the fight via technical knockout in round one.

Pico faced Henry Corrales at Bellator 214 on January 26, 2019. He lost the fight via knockout in the first round.

Pico faced Ádám Borics at Bellator 222 on June 14, 2019. He lost the fight via technical knockout in the second round.

Pico faced Daniel Carey at Bellator 238 on January 25, 2020. He won the fight via knockout in the second round.

Pico faced Chris Hatley Jr. at Bellator 242 on July 24, 2020. He won the fight via submission in the first round.

Pico faced John de Jesus at Bellator 252 on November 12, 2020. He won via second round knockout.

Pico was expected to face Aiden Lee on April 16, 2021 at Bellator 257. However, on April 4, Pico had to pull out of the bout due to medical issues. The fight eventually took place at Bellator 260 on June 11, 2021. He won the fight via submission in the third round.

Pico faced Justin Gonzales on November 12, 2021 at Bellator 271. He won the bout in dominant fashion via unanimous decision.

As the first bout of his new, multi-fight contract Pico was scheduled to face Jeremy Kennedy on April 15, 2022 at Bellator 277. However, Kennedy withdrew 8 days before the event and Adli Edwards replaced him. He won the bout via TKO in the third round.

The bout against Jeremy Kennedy was rebooked for October 1, 2022 at Bellator 286. After hurting his shoulder mid way through the first round, the bout was stopped after the first round by the doctor. It was later revealed that Pico had not substained a break, just a dislocation.

Pico is scheduled to return from injury against Otto Rodrigues on April 22, 2023 at Bellator 295.

Personal life 
Aaron Pico is a seventh generation Californio.  Pico is a direct descendant of Pío de Jesus Pico, who was the last Mexican Governor of California under the Providence of Mexico.

Pico and his wife Kylie have a son, Valentino (born 2021).

Championships and accomplishments 
 Freestyle wrestling
       2016 US Olympic Team Trials Senior Men Freestyle 65 kg 2nd place
       2016 Alexander Medved International Senior Men Freestyle 65 kg Bronze Medal
       2015 Cerro Pelado International Senior Men Freestyle 65 kg Champion – Havana, Cuba
 	2014 Henri Deglane Challenge Senior Men Freestyle 65 kg Champion – Nice, France
 	2014 Soslan Andiyev Senior Men Freestyle 70 kg Bronze Medal – North Ossetia – Alania, Russia
 	2014 Grand Prix of Spain Senior Men Freestyle 65 kg Silver Medal – Madrid, Spain
 Boxing
 2008 Desert Showdown Champ – Indio, CA
 2008 California State PAL Champ – Oxnard, CA
 2008 National PAL Champ – Tournament Outstanding Boxer Award– Oxnard, CA
 2009 Desert Showdown Champ – Indio, CA
 2009 National Junior Golden Gloves Championship Champ – Mesquite, NV Tournament Outstanding Boxer Award
 Pankration
 2008 – CA State Pankration Championships Champ – Santa Ana, CA
 2008 – National Pankration Championships Champ – Santa Ana, CA
 2009 – CA State Pankration Championships Champ – Santa Ana, CA
 2010 – Golden Cup European Pankration Champ – Kharkov, Ukraine

Mixed martial arts record 

|-
|Loss
|align=center|10–4
|Jeremy Kennedy
|TKO (shoulder injury)
|Bellator 286
|
|align=center|1
|align=center|5:00
|Long Beach, California, United States
|
|-
|Win
|align=center|10–3
|Adli Edwards
|TKO (punches)
|Bellator 277
|
|align=center|3
|align=center|0:55
|San Jose, California, United States
|
|-
| Win
| align=center| 9–3
| Justin Gonzales
| Decision (unanimous)
| Bellator 271
| 
| align=center| 3
| align=center| 5:00
| Hollywood, Florida, United States
|
|-
|Win
|align=center|8–3
|Aiden Lee
|Submission (anaconda choke)
|Bellator 260
|
|align=center|3
|align=center|1:33
|Uncasville, Connecticut, United States
|
|-
|Win
|align=center|7–3
|John de Jesus 
|KO (punch)
|Bellator 252
|
|align=center|2
|align=center|4:12
|Uncasville, Connecticut, United States
|
|-
|Win
|align=center|6–3
|Chris Hatley
|Submission (rear-naked choke)
|Bellator 242
|
|align=center|1
|align=center|2:10
|Uncasville, Connecticut, United States
|
|-
|Win
|align=center|5–3
|Daniel Carey
|KO (punch)
|Bellator 238
|
|align=center|2
|align=center|0:15
|Inglewood, California, United States
|
|-
|Loss
|align=center|4–3
|Ádám Borics	
|TKO (flying knee and punches)
|Bellator 222
|
|align=center| 2
|align=center| 3:55
|New York City, New York, United States
|
|-
|Loss
|align=center|4–2
|Henry Corrales
|KO (punches)
|Bellator 214
|
|align=center|1
|align=center|1:07
|Inglewood, California, United States
|
|-
|Win
|align=center|4–1
|Leandro Higo
|TKO (punches)
|Bellator 206
|
|align=center|1
|align=center|3:19
|San Jose, California, United States
|
|-
|Win
|align=center|3–1
|Lee Morrison
|TKO (punches)
|Bellator 199
|
|align=center|1
|align=center|1:10
|San Jose, California, United States
|
|-
|Win
|align=center|2–1
|Shane Krutchen
|KO (punch to the body)
|Bellator 192
|
|align=center|1
|align=center|0:37
|Inglewood, California, United States
|
|-
|Win
|align=center|1–1
|Justin Linn
|KO (punch)
|Bellator 183
|
|align=center|1
|align=center|3:45
|San Jose, California, United States
|
|-
|Loss 
|align=center|0–1
|Zach Freeman
|Submission (guillotine choke) 
|Bellator 180 
| 
|align=center|1
|align=center|0:24
|New York City, New York, United States 
|

Freestyle record

! colspan="7"| Senior Freestyle Matches
|-
!  Res.
!  Record
!  Opponent
!  Score
!  Date
!  Event
!  Location
|-
! style=background:white colspan=7 | 
|-
|Loss
|40–14
|align=left| Frank Molinaro
|style="font-size:88%"|4–4
|style="font-size:88%"rowspan=6|April 9–10, 2016
|style="font-size:88%"rowspan=6|2016 US Olympic Team Trials
|style="text-align:left;font-size:88%;" rowspan=6|
 Iowa City, Iowa
|-
|Loss
|40–13
|align=left| Frank Molinaro
|style="font-size:88%"|3–4
|-
|Win
|40–12
|align=left| Frank Molinaro
|style="font-size:88%"|4–2
|-
|Win
|39–12
|align=left| Reece Humphrey
|style="font-size:88%"|TF 12–1
|-
|Win
|38–12
|align=left| Jordan Oliver
|style="font-size:88%"|11–9
|-
|Win
|37–12
|align=left| Jayson Ness
|style="font-size:88%"|TF 20–9
|-
! style=background:white colspan=7 |
|-
|Win
|36–12
|align=left| Davit Tlashadze 
|style="font-size:88%"|10–5
|style="font-size:88%" rowspan=5|February 18–19, 2016 
|style="font-size:88%" rowspan=5|2016 Alexander Medved Prizes Ranking Series
|style="text-align:left;font-size:88%;" rowspan=5|
 Minsk, Belarus
|-
|Loss
|35–12
|align=left| Zurabi Iakobishvili
|style="font-size:88%"|3–5
|-
|Win
|35–11
|align=left| Andrei Karpach
|style="font-size:88%"|TF 12–0
|-
|Win
|34–11
|align=left| Ganzorigiin Mandakhnaran
|style="font-size:88%"|TF 11–0
|-
|Win
|33–11
|align=left| Kanat Musabekov
|style="font-size:88%"|TF 14–4
|-
! style=background:white colspan=7 |
|-
|Loss
|32–11
|align=left| Valter Margaryan
|style="font-size:88%"|
|style="font-size:88%" rowspan=3|February 13–14, 2016 
|style="font-size:88%" rowspan=3|XXth Outstanding Ukrainian Wrestlers and Coaches Memorial
|style="text-align:left;font-size:88%;" rowspan=3|
 Kiev, Ukraine
|-
|Loss
|32–10
|align=left| Saeed Dadashpour
|style="font-size:88%"|3–7
|-
|Win
|32–9
|align=left| Nazar Kulchytskyy
|style="font-size:88%"|6–2
|-
! style=background:white colspan=7 |
|-
|Loss
|31–9
|align=left| Reece Humphrey
|style="font-size:88%"|TF 0–10
|style="font-size:88%" rowspan=6|December 17–19, 2015 
|style="font-size:88%" rowspan=6|2015 US Senior National Championships
|style="text-align:left;font-size:88%;" rowspan=6|
 Las Vegas, Nevada
|-
|Win
|31–8
|align=left| Frank Molinaro
|style="font-size:88%"|14–5
|-
|Loss
|30–8
|align=left| Logan Stieber
|style="font-size:88%"|5–13
|-
|Win
|30–7
|align=left| Kellen Russell
|style="font-size:88%"|10–3
|-
|Win
|29–7
|align=left| Justin Feldman
|style="font-size:88%"|TF 10–0
|-
|Win
|28–7
|align=left| Nick Dardanes
|style="font-size:88%"|6–0
|-
! style=background:white colspan=7 |
|-
|Win
|27–7
|align=left| Frank Molinaro
|style="font-size:88%"|7–4
|style="font-size:88%" rowspan=7|November 5–7, 2015 
|style="font-size:88%" rowspan=7|2015 Bill Farrell International Open
|style="text-align:left;font-size:88%;" rowspan=7|
 New York City, New York
|-
|Win
|26–7
|align=left| Jason Chamberlain
|style="font-size:88%"|11–4
|-
|Win
|25–7
|align=left| Nazar Kulchytskyy
|style="font-size:88%"|8–2
|-
|Win
|24–7
|align=left| Kendric Maple
|style="font-size:88%"|TF 11–0
|-
|Loss
|23–7
|align=left| Frank Molinaro
|style="font-size:88%"|2–4
|-
|Win
|23–6
|align=left| Filip Stefanov
|style="font-size:88%"|TF 10–0
|-
|Win
|22–6
|align=left| Mario Mason
|style="font-size:88%"|TF 10–0
|-
! style=background:white colspan=7 |
|-
|Loss
|21–6
|align=left| Azamat Omurzhanov
|style="font-size:88%"|4–4
|style="font-size:88%" rowspan=5|October 16–18, 2015
|style="font-size:88%" rowspan=5|2015 Intercontinental Cup
|style="text-align:left;font-size:88%;" rowspan=5|
 Khasavyurt, Russia
|-
|Loss
|21–5
|align=left| Amir Berukov
|style="font-size:88%"|8–12
|-
|Win
|21–4
|align=left| Abutalim Gamzaev
|style="font-size:88%"|13–9
|-
|Win
|20–4
|align=left| Magomed Khizriev
|style="font-size:88%"|11–9
|-
|Win
|19–4
|align=left| Arsen Gusbanov
|style="font-size:88%"|TF 11–0
|-
|Loss
|18–4
|align=left| Brent Metcalf
|style="font-size:88%"|3–5
|style="font-size:88%"|April 6, 2015
|style="font-size:88%"|2015 Agon V
|style="text-align:left;font-size:88%;" |
 Cedar Rapids, Iowa
|-
! style=background:white colspan=7 |
|-
|Win
|18–3
|align=left| Reece Humphrey
|style="font-size:88%"|6–0
|style="font-size:88%" rowspan=4|February 11–15, 2015 
|style="font-size:88%" rowspan=4|2015 Granma y Cerro Pelado International
|style="text-align:left;font-size:88%;" rowspan=4|
 Havana, Cuba
|-
|Win
|17–3
|align=left| Alejandro Valdés
|style="font-size:88%"|5–2
|-
|Win
|16–3
|align=left| Franklin Maren
|style="font-size:88%"|1–1
|-
|Win
|15–3
|align=left| Matheus Frota
|style="font-size:88%"|TF 10–0
|-
! style=background:white colspan=7 | 
|-
|Loss
|14–3
|align=left| Akhmed Chakaev
|style="font-size:88%"|3–6
|style="font-size:88%"|January 22–26, 2015
|style="font-size:88%"|Golden Grand Prix Ivan Yarygin 2015
|style="text-align:left;font-size:88%;" |
 Krasnoyarsk, Russia
|-
! style=background:white colspan=7 |
|-
|Win
|14–2
|align=left| Devid Safaryan
|style="font-size:88%"|7–5
|style="font-size:88%" rowspan=5|November 28–29, 2014 
|style="font-size:88%" rowspan=5|2014 Henri Deglane Challenge
|style="text-align:left;font-size:88%;" rowspan=5|
 Nice, France
|-
|Win
|13–2
|align=left| Davit Berdznishvili
|style="font-size:88%"|10–5
|-
|Win
|11–2
|align=left| Maxime Fiquet
|style="font-size:88%"|TF 12–0
|-
|Win
|10–2
|align=left| Ruslan Mukhtarov
|style="font-size:88%"|TF 14–4
|-
|Win
|9–2
|align=left| Bruno Lawson
|style="font-size:88%"|TF 11–0
|-
! style=background:white colspan=7 |
|-
|Win
|8–2
|align=left|
|style="font-size:88%"|TF
|style="font-size:88%" rowspan=5|October 24, 2014 
|style="font-size:88%" rowspan=5|2014 Soslan Andiev International
|style="text-align:left;font-size:88%;" rowspan=5|
 Vladikavkaz, Russia
|-
|Win
|7–2
|align=left|
|style="font-size:88%"|TF 
|-
|Win
|6–2
|align=left|
|style="font-size:88%"|TF
|-
|Loss
|5–2
|align=left| Magomed Khizriev
|style="font-size:88%"|
|-
|Win
|5–1
|align=left|
|style="font-size:88%"|TF
|-
! style=background:white colspan=7 |
|-
|Loss
|4–1
|align=left| Frank Chamizo
|style="font-size:88%"|2–4
|style="font-size:88%" rowspan=4|July 5, 2014 
|style="font-size:88%" rowspan=4|2014 Grand Prix of Spain
|style="text-align:left;font-size:88%;" rowspan=4|
 Madrid, Spain
|-
|Win
|4–0
|align=left| Lee Seung-bong
|style="font-size:88%"|TF 10–0
|-
|Win
|3–0
|align=left| Abdollahpour Gholamreza
|style="font-size:88%"|9–1
|-
|Win
|2–0
|align=left| Rodrigue Lawson Massamba
|style="font-size:88%"|TF 11–0
|-
|Win
|1–0
|align=left| Alibeggadzhi Emeev
|style="font-size:88%"|8–0
|style="font-size:88%"|November 16, 2013
|style="font-size:88%"|2013 USA vs. Russia Dual Meet I
|style="text-align:left;font-size:88%;" |
 Clifton Park, New York
|-

See also
 List of current Bellator fighters

References

External links
 Aaron Pico Official Website

1996 births
Sportspeople from Whittier, California
Living people
American male sport wrestlers
American male mixed martial artists
American practitioners of Brazilian jiu-jitsu
American sportspeople of Mexican descent
Californios
Lightweight mixed martial artists
Featherweight mixed martial artists
Mixed martial artists from California
Mixed martial artists utilizing boxing
Mixed martial artists utilizing pankration
Mixed martial artists utilizing freestyle wrestling
Mixed martial artists utilizing Greco-Roman wrestling
Mixed martial artists utilizing Brazilian jiu-jitsu
Amateur wrestlers
People from Whittier, California
Bellator male fighters
American people of African descent